The United States offshore drilling debate is an ongoing debate in the United States about whether, the extent to which, in which areas, and under what conditions, further offshore drilling should be allowed in U.S.-administered waters. 

The issue saw increased coverage when President George W. Bush, in July 2008, lifted a 1990 executive order by his father, President George H. W. Bush, banning offshore drilling, and calling for drilling in the Arctic National Wildlife Refuge.

The issue of offshore drilling became central in the 2008 presidential election, not least because of the oil price increases since 2003. It is also being debated in terms of both environmental issues and U.S. energy independence. As of September 2008, President Barack Obama was for limited offshore drilling as part of an extensive energy independence overhaul.

Bush's energy policy was named "drill and veto" by U.S. House Speaker Nancy Pelosi. The Drill Responsibly in Leased Lands (DRILL) Act (H.R. 6515) is one of the bills discussed in the Congress about drilling. In Florida, many counties, cities, chambers of commerce, and other local agencies have passed resolutions against oil drilling in Florida waters.

On March 31, 2010, President Obama announced that he was opening new areas in U.S. coastal waters to offshore drilling for gas and oil. This was in stark contrast to his reaction only a few weeks later to the Deepwater Horizon oil spill in the Gulf of Mexico that has become the largest offshore oil spill in United States history. In November 2010, the Obama administration rescinded the decision to open new areas.

Background

As interpreted by the federal courts, the Commerce Clause of the United States Constitution gives the federal government certain regulatory power over "navigable waters" of the United States. The Submerged Lands Act of 1953 and Continental Shelf Lands Act of 1953, along with the 1960 Supreme Court decision in United States v. States of Louisiana, Texas, Mississippi, Alabama, and Florida, divided ownership of the tidelands of the United States between state and federal governments. The federal government owns the remainder of the territorial waters.

The 28 January 1969 blowout at a Unocal rig, which spilled  of petroleum off the coast of Santa Barbara, California, resulted in drilling bans in offshore California and Florida.

Offshore drilling has continued in offshore Texas and Louisiana. In 2006, an  area in the Gulf of Mexico known as lease 181 was opened for exploration. The existing moratorium on leasing on the Outer Continental Shelf expired in 2012, and the debate is on whether or not to extend it.

In 2018, a new federal initiative to expand offshore drilling suddenly excluded Florida, but although this would be favored by Floridians, concerns remain about the basis for that apparently arbitrary exception being merely politically motivated and tentative. No scientific, military, or economic basis for the decision was given, provoking continuing public concern in Florida.

Positive effects

Energy independence

 
A common argument in favor of offshore drilling is it reduces United States dependency on imported oil. Geopolitically, the U.S. would be less vulnerable to sanctions by oil-producing countries hostile to the United States. It would also make the United States less vulnerable to a stop in a country's oil exports, due to, for example, a civil war or an invasion of that country. The debate often makes references to the 1973 oil crisis and 1979 energy crisis.

Fuel price
One motivation of increased offshore drilling is to reduce the current fuel prices. In 2007, the Energy Information Administration at the U.S. Dep. of Energy analyzed the effect of lifting the ban on oil and gas leasing on the Atlantic and Pacific coasts and the eastern Gulf of Mexico. With leasing beginning in 2012, the agency projected that production of oil would not be expected to start before 2017, and that as a result US oil production by 2030 would be 7% higher than it would be otherwise. The effect on fuel prices, however, would be "insignificant."

The Natural Resources Defense Council estimated that with increased offshore leasing and drilling, the price of oil would only drop about 3–4 cents in 15 to 20 years.

Trade deficit
Oil produced from offshore drilling reduces oil imports, and thus lessens the U.S. trade deficit. From mid-2017 to early 2018, crude oil imports increased from $45 per barrel to $62 per barrel. Rising oil prices have driven some with U.S. oil stakeholders to argue all options must be considered to reduce the national deficit; including expanded national oil production.

Negative effects

Military training
In 2005, U.S. Defense Secretary Donald Rumsfeld stated that offshore drilling would disrupt military training and weapons testing, if done in an area of the Gulf of Mexico along the coast of Florida.

International relations
Although offshore drilling has long been banned in federal waters off the state of Florida, Cuba has been drilling its own offshore area near Florida.  The subject became an issue in the 2008 presidential race, with assertions and denials of the reality of Cuban offshore drilling.  On 31 October 2008, Brazilian and Cuban presidents Luiz Inácio Lula da Silva and Raul Castro attended a ceremony at which the Brazilian oil company Petrobras agreed to drill for oil in Cuban offshore waters near Florida. By May 2011 Petrobas had withdrawn from the agreement due to poor prospects.

More recently, Russia has begun drilling in the Black Sea with a Chinese-made oil rig, Scarabeo 9. Since the rig wasn't built in the U.S. and was agreed to before the imposition of additional sanctions by the E.U. in 2014, Russia has been able to avoid sanctions and operate the rig.

Oil spills

Offshore facilities pose an environmental risk of oil spills.  On April 20, 2010, an underwater blowout and subsequent explosion and fire destroyed the Deepwater Horizon rig owned by Transocean Ltd. and operating in the Gulf of Mexico under lease to energy giant BP, resulting in the largest oil spill in United States history. Five million barrels of oil were spilled into the Gulf of Mexico, leading to $21.5 billion (or $4300 per barrel) of clean-up costs paid by BP.

Endangered species 
As of 2010, the federal Minerals Management Service had given permission to BP and dozens of other oil companies to drill in the Gulf of Mexico without first getting required permits that assesses threats to endangered species.

In the aftermath of the Deepwater Horizon explosion, aka BP Oil spill, Defenders of Wildlife and the Southern Environmental Law Center sued BP for imperiling 32 threatened or endangered species. These included the sperm whale, gulf sturgeon, manatee and five kinds of sea turtles, in addition to the surrounding water and habitats that were damaged.
With every oil spill, endangered species in the area get closer to extinction.

Public opinion
Polls by independent national polling concerns in the US generally show fluctuating public opinions of offshore drilling in the last decade.

The Pew Research Center, which had documented a large and sharp drop in support for allowing more offshore drilling following the Deepwater Horizon spill in 2010 (down to 44% in favor versus 52% against), found that by March 2012, support for increased offshore drilling had returned to its pre-Deepwater Horizon level, with 65% in favor versus 31% against.

A series of CNN polls 2008-2011 showed that support for increased offshore drilling dropped from 75% before the Deepwater Horizon spill to 57% shortly after. By April 2011, support had increased to 69%, versus 31% opposed.

The Gallup organization found 50% support for increased offshore drilling in May 2010, a month after the Deepwater Horizon explosion. By March 2011, that support had increased to 60% in favor versus 37% opposed.

A more recent study conducted in 2018 by the Pew Research Center found that 51% of Americans now oppose expanded offshore oil rigs versus 42% favoring expanded offshore oil rigs. This represents a 10% decline in those favoring offshore oil rigs since 2014. Generally, people who live within 25 miles of the coastline oppose offshore oil drilling more so than those who live farther from the coast. Also, Democrats oppose additional rig development at a rate of 71%, while only 22% of Democrats favor more offshore oil rigs. On the other hand, 70% of Republicans favor increased offshore drilling in comparison to 25% opposition. Lastly, younger people (aged 18–49) oppose increased offshore drilling at a rate of 58%, compared to only 42% opposition for people aged older than 49.

See also
Arctic Refuge drilling controversy
"Drill, baby, drill", a Republican campaign slogan originally used at the 2008 Republican National Convention
Offshore drilling
Offshore oil and gas in the United States
United States oil politics
Environmental issues in the United States
Offshore Energy and Jobs Act (H.R. 2231; 113th Congress) - a 2013 proposed bill that would revise policy regarding offshore drilling in the United States

References

Energy policy of the United States
Fossil fuels in the United States
Offshore drilling debate
Environmental controversies